"The Man Who Would Be King" is an 1888 short story by Rudyard Kipling concerning two ambitious British ex-soldiers. 

The Man Who Would Be King may also refer to:

The Man Who Would Be King (film), a 1975 film adaptation of the Kipling story
The Man Who Would Be King: The First American in Afghanistan, 2005 book by Ben Macintyre
"The Man Who Would Be King" (Supernatural), an episode of the American television series Supernatural (S6E20, 6 May 2011)
"The Man Who Would Be King", a song by The Libertines on their album The Libertines
"The Man Who Would Be King", a song by Neal Morse on his eponymous solo album Neal Morse
"The Man Who Would Be King", a song by Dio on their album Master of the Moon
"The Man Who Would Be King", a song by Iron Maiden on their album The Final Frontier